The Dodges Ferry Football Club, nicknamed The Sharks, is an Australian rules football club based in the Hobart suburb of Dodges Ferry. The club currently plays in the Southern Football League (SFL) in Tasmania, Australia. The club wears a red, yellow and black jumper and has the mascot the Sharks. The club spent its first 23 years in the Tasman Football Association (TFA) where it won half a dozen premierships. The league folded after the 2001 season. The Sharks then entered the SFL in 2002. Dodges won their first SFL premiership in 2006 and were runners up in 2010.

Home grounds, club achievements and records
Shark Park – 1993–present
Founded – 1978
Colours – Red, yellow and blue
Emblem – Sharks
Club record games holder:
Paul "Wally" Cusick – 469 games
Southern Football League premierships
2006
Southern Football League runners-up
2010
Southern Football League leading goalkickers
2021 - Campbell Hooker - 81
Tasman Football Association premierships
 1979, 1980, 1984, 1989, 1990, 1991
Tasman Football Association leading goalkickers
1980 - Eddie Gotowski - 54
1983 - Gary Pears - 83
1994 - Bruce Rainbird  - 104
Club record score
449 - Dodges Ferry 68.41.449 (v Railway 3.0.18) - Tasman FA - 1993
Club record quarter
Unknown

External links
 Southern Football League official website

Australian rules football clubs in Tasmania
1978 establishments in Australia